Nosratabad (also Romanized as Noşratābād and Nasratābād) is a village in Mahmudabad-e Seyyed Rural District, in the Central District of Sirjan County, Kerman Province, Iran. At the 2006 census, its population was 2,102, in 523 families.

References 

Populated places in Sirjan County